"Tell Me Why" is a single by Exposé, released on December 9, 1989. It was written and produced by Lewis Martineé. The song was included on Exposé's second album, What You Don't Know. Lead vocals on "Tell Me Why" were sung by Gioia Bruno.

Reception
Released as the third single from What You Don't Know, "Tell Me Why" continued a successful streak for the group on the Billboard Hot 100 chart when it peaked at #9 in early 1990. It was Exposé's seventh consecutive top ten hit on the Hot 100, dating back to "Come Go with Me" in April 1987. Remixes of the song were popular in U.S. dance clubs, allowing it to reach #3 on the Billboard Hot Dance Club Play chart, the group's fifth top ten single on this survey. The song reached the lower region of the UK Singles Chart, spending one week at #97.

Music video
The music video shows the members of Exposé lip-synching the song interspersed with scenes implying urban gang violence. Lyrics such as Give me a reason for all this senseless crime / We can change it, why they have to die support an ultimate message of appealing to stop these sorts of activities. The video concludes with images of children playing and singing together on a playground.

Track listing

U.K. 12" vinyl

A1 - "Tell Me Why" 12" Remix (6:28)
B1 - "Tell Me Why" Extended Remix (6:38)
B2 - "Let Me Down Easy" (4:07)

Tracks
 United States 12 "Single

 U.S. Promo CD Single

 UK Promo CD Single

Performance on the charts

References

External links
UK 12" single info from discogs.com

1989 singles
Exposé (group) songs
Songs written by Lewis Martineé
1989 songs
Arista Records singles